Carel Willem Hendrik Boshoff (9 November 1927 – 16 March 2011) was a South African professor of theology and Afrikaner white nationalist.

Biography
Boshoff was born in Nylstroom in the Transvaal Province as the second child of Willem Sterrenberg Boshoff and Anna Maria "Annie" Boshoff. Boshoff's mother, Anna, was the second wife of his father; together they had 7 children in addition to the six from his father's first marriage. Carel Boshoff spent much of his youth at his father's ranch in the Waterberg District in the northern Transvaal, attended the University of Pretoria and attained his doctorate in theology in 1951 after doing missionary work throughout the old Transvaal Province. He spoke the Sepedi (Northern Sotho) language fluently and served as Secretary of Missions for the Dutch Reformed Church.

Boshoff's wife (also named Anna), whom he married in 1954, was the daughter of Hendrik Frensch Verwoerd who served as prime minister of South Africa (1958-1966) and became known as the architect of apartheid. They had seven children; she died in 2007. Boshoff led the Voortrekker movement from 1981 to 1989. Further, he served as chairman of the Afrikaner Broederbond from 1980 to 1983. He had to leave the Broederbond in 1983, when members of the newly formed Conservative Party were not welcome any more. He chaired the Freedom Front in Northern Cape from 1994.

Boshoff established the Afrikaner Volkswag in May 1984 with the ostensible purpose of defending Afrikaner culture, although in practice it was mainly involved in opposing the liberalising of some racial laws under P.W. Botha. Boshoff had attempted to affiliate his group to the Federasie van Afrikaanse Kultuurvereniginge soon after its foundation but the application was rejected due to the political nature of the Volkswag. The following year he was involved in the setting up of the Vereniging Bybel en Volk, an opposition group within the Reformed Churches in South Africa established after the church leadership endorsed a motion of condemnation of apartheid passed by the Reformed Ecumenical Synod.

In 1988 he founded AVSTIG or Afrikaner Vryheidstigting, although he is mainly known as the founder in 1990 of Orania, an Afrikaner settlement intended as the beginning of a volkstaat. Boshoff admitted his disappointment that it Orania had only 810 residents rather than the 60,000 he had anticipated. In 2004 Orania issued its own currency, the Ora. The area is noted for its Koeksister monument. Boshoff was the president of the Orania movement ('Orania beweging') until 2007. After he became disabled due to illness, his son, Carel Boshoff IV, took over all the above positions.

Death
Boshoff died aged 83 from cancer at his home on 16 March 2011.

Chairmanships

See also

 Carel Boshoff IV
 Orania, Northern Cape
 Freedom Front Plus

References

External links

1927 births
2011 deaths
People from Modimolle Local Municipality
Afrikaner people
South African Protestant missionaries
Members of the Dutch Reformed Church in South Africa (NGK)
Freedom Front Plus politicians
Dutch Reformed Church missionaries
Protestant missionaries in South Africa
University of Pretoria alumni
Academic staff of the University of Pretoria
Deaths from cancer in South Africa
Orania, Northern Cape